Emilio Jaconelli (born 5 June 1983 in Lanark) is a Scottish former professional footballer.

Jaconelli began his career at Kilmarnock in 2001 and made his senior debut against Livingston on 29 December 2001. He made a further seven appearances for Kilmarnock before being released and moving to Queen of the South on 9 July 2003. Whilst in Dumfries he made over thirty appearances yet only scored three goals, all of them over a four-game spell. His first senior goal was against Brechin City on 24 April 2004. In 2005, he moved to Raith Rovers but after an unsuccessful season he left for junior football.
On 5 October 2011 Irvine Meadow striker Emilio Jaconelli retired due to a long term injury to his anterior cruciate ligament.

References

External links

Raith Rovers profile

1983 births
Living people
Scottish footballers
Scottish Premier League players
Kilmarnock F.C. players
Queen of the South F.C. players
Raith Rovers F.C. players
Association football forwards
Scottish Football League players
Scottish Junior Football Association players
Irvine Meadow XI F.C. players
Sportspeople from Lanark
Footballers from South Lanarkshire